Morgan McMichaels (born May 28, 1981) is the stage name of Scottish-American drag performer Thomas White,  best known as a contestant on the second season of the reality television competition RuPaul's Drag Race, as well as the third season of the show's All-Stars spinoff. She has also been involved in various Drag Race spin-offs, including RuPaul's Drag U and RuPaul's Secret Celebrity Drag Race.

Early life
White was born in 1981 in Alexandria, Scotland to a Scottish father and an American mother, and spent parts of his childhood in both Scotland and the United States. White attended primary school in the US before returning to West Dunbartonshire as a teenager, studying biochemistry and immunology at the University of the West of Scotland, before leaving at the age of 18 for California, where he decided to pursue a stage career instead of returning to Scotland. Having been introduced to drag through the character Lily Savage, McMichaels stated his own alter ego wouldn't have emerged if he had stayed at university. White‘s stage name pays homage to Morgan le Fay, a figure of Arthurian legend that links to his own Scottish heritage, with the surname McMichaels originating from his drag mother, Chad Michaels, who appeared on the 4th season of RuPaul's Drag Race and 1st season of RuPaul's Drag Race: All Stars, winning the latter, and his drag father, Adam Magee.

Career

RuPaul's Drag Race

McMichaels joined the cast of the second season of RuPaul's Drag Race in 2010. She was eliminated after losing a lip sync performance battle to contestant Sahara Davenport, placing eighth out of twelve.

McMichaels later went on to participate in the third season of RuPaul's Drag Race: All Stars, where she was eliminated first by BenDeLaCreme for saying she would send home the best competitors if she stayed. This placed her 10th in the season. She returned in the 6th episode among five eliminated queens (Thorgy Thor, Milk, Chi Chi Devayne and Aja) and was selected to be brought back by BenDeLaCreme, ultimately placing 5th.

After Drag Race
McMichaels, along with fellow contestants Raven, Jujubee, Pandora Boxx, Nina Flowers, Shannel and Tammie Brown appeared in RuPaul's Drag U, a spinoff Logo series in 2010, where she appeared as a "professor" for three episodes. She remained in the cast on the second season of Drag U, which made its season premiere on 20 June 2011, and was a professor for two more episodes. She returned again for one episode in the third season of Drag U in 2012.

Other than Drag Race related shows, McMichaels was featured in the music video for "S&M" by Barbadian singer Rihanna in 2011. On 11 April 2013, McMichaels made a guest appearance on Tabatha Takes Over at the VIP Nightclub in Riverside, California where McMichaels performed a lip sync as Tabatha. Morgan was also featured in Lady Gaga's lyric video of "Applause" along with other drag queens. She hosted an internet show for WOWPresents called Living For The Lip Sync where she talks about lip sync fan-recorded performances by Drag Race alumni. It premiered to YouTube on September 4, 2014, and ended on January 22, 2015. She made an appearance on Entertainment Tonight to talk about All Stars 3 in 2018. She was featured with Laganja Estranja, Farrah Moan and Jaidynn Diore-Fierce on season 13 of Germany's Next Topmodel as a guest for the episode 14 challenge. He appeared in a music video for Lizzo's song "Juice" on April 17, 2019. She was a backup dancer for Nico Tortorella in an episode of Lip Sync Battle in 2019.

In Episode 4 of All Stars 5, she made a guest appearance as a "Lip Sync Assassin", where she lip-synced against Miz Cracker.

Music 
McMichaels released her first single, "Why You Mad Tho?" on February 3, 2018, with the remix by producer Drew G Rdr. McMichaels performed the single live on the Drag Race: All Stars 3 premiere episode talent show. She released a second single, "Yazz Bitch" on May 11, 2018.

Personal life 
In October 2018, White broke his hand in self-defense after a physical altercation with a man who proclaimed to be a Nazi.

Filmography

Television

Film

Music videos

Web series

Discography

Singles

Featured singles

References

External links
 
 Morgan McMichaels interview on Logo

1981 births
Living people
American drag queens
Scottish drag queens
People from Alexandria, West Dunbartonshire
People from Los Angeles
Morgan McMichaels
Scottish emigrants to the United States
RuPaul's Drag Race All Stars contestants